Lutz Mack (born 9 October 1952) is a German former gymnast. He competed at the 1976 and 1980 Summer Olympics in all artistic gymnastics events and won a bronze and a silver medal with the East German team, respectively. His best individual result was ninth place in the rings in 1976. He won four bronze medals at the 1974 and 1978 world championships and 1979 European championships.

References

External links
 
 

1952 births
Living people
People from Delitzsch
People from Bezirk Leipzig
German male artistic gymnasts
Sportspeople from Saxony
Olympic gymnasts of East Germany
Gymnasts at the 1976 Summer Olympics
Gymnasts at the 1980 Summer Olympics
Olympic silver medalists for East Germany
Olympic bronze medalists for East Germany
Olympic medalists in gymnastics
Medalists at the 1980 Summer Olympics
Medalists at the 1976 Summer Olympics
Medalists at the World Artistic Gymnastics Championships
Recipients of the Patriotic Order of Merit in bronze